The Belgian Bowl XXII was held on May 31, 2009 and was won by the West Flanders Tribes for their fourth Championship in a row.

2009 Playoffs
The 2 teams that played in the Belgian Bowl were the winners of the Semi Finals. West Flanders Tribes and Tournai Phoenix received byes straight into the Semi Finals since they were the winners of seasonal play in the FFL and LFFAB respectively. The Quarterfinals were played on 10 May and the Semi Finals on 17 May.

References

External links
Official Belgian Bowl website

American football in Belgium
Belgian Bowl
Belgian Bowl